The Telecommunications Industry Association  (TIA) ANSI/TIA-942-B Telecommunications Infrastructure Standard for Data Centers is an American National Standard (ANS) that specifies the minimum requirements for data center infrastructure and is often cited by companies such as ADC Telecommunications and Cisco Systems.
The standard was updated with an addendum ANSI/TIA-942-B-1 in February 2022 from the TR-42.1 Engineering Committee. 

The Telecommunications Industry Association offers TIA-942 certification programs through TIA-licensed certification bodies that assess and certify compliance to the TIA-942 standard.  

In June 2021, the TIA TR-42.1 Engineering Committee voted to start the revision process of ANSI/TIA-942-B. The standard will undergo updates during 2022. The new version of ANSI/TIA-942 which will be labelled as ANSI/TIA-942-C is expected to be released in 2023.

Specifications 
The ANSI/TIA-942-B specification references private and public domain data center requirements for data center infrastructure elements such as:
 Network architecture
 Electrical design
Mechanical systems
 System redundancy for electrical, mechanical and telecommunication
Fire safety
Physical security
Efficiency

Newer revisions 
As of August 2021, TIA has released a licensing scheme for TIA-942 audits. TIA has laid down specific criteria for organizations who wish to conduct 3rd party external audits. Once fulfilled they will be licensed as a CAB - Conformity Assessment Body. Data centers conforming to the TIA-942 standard are listed on the website; https://tiaonline.org/942-datacenters/.

References

Local area networks
Telecommunications standards